Luis M. Viceira is an American economist currently the George E. Bates Professor at Harvard Business School.  He graduated from Autonomous University of Madrid and Harvard University (MA and PhD in Economics).

References

Year of birth missing (living people)
Living people
Harvard Business School faculty
American economists
Place of birth missing (living people)
Autonomous University of Madrid alumni
Harvard College alumni
Harvard Graduate School of Arts and Sciences alumni